Ruslan Mirzoivych Dzhalilov (born January 24, 1982, in Zelenodolsk) is a Ukrainian sprint canoer who has competed since the mid-2000s. At the 2004 Summer Olympics in Athens, he was eliminated in the semifinals of both the C-2 500 m and C-2 1000 m events. Four years later in Beijing, Dzhalilov was eliminated in the semifinals of the C-2 1000 m event.

References
 Sports-Reference.com profile

1982 births
Canoeists at the 2004 Summer Olympics
Canoeists at the 2008 Summer Olympics
Living people
People from Zelenodolsk
Olympic canoeists of Ukraine
Ukrainian male canoeists
Sportspeople from Dnipropetrovsk Oblast
21st-century Ukrainian people